Replenishment military service (Chinese: 補充兵役) is a type of military service to make up for vacancies in active service. This type of military service can be found in the military service systems of several East Asian countries. It is also translated as "Replacement service" (Republic of China) or "Supplementary service" (Republic of Korea). Those who belong to it are  "Replenishment soldiers", "Replacement soldiers" or "Supplementary soldiers"

Countries

Japan (before 1945) 
This provision consisted of Articles 125 to 130.

When the Military Service Act was enacted in place of the Conscription ordinance, it was written as hoju hei-eki (replenishment territorial army and naval volunteer reserve. a literal translation: Replenishment military service.)

Republic of China (Taiwan) 
In 1946, the Republic of China revised the Military Service Act, adding a species called supplementary military service. It was divided into supplementary military service in active service and supplementary military service in reserve.

Republic of Korea (South Korea) 
The Military Service Act was enacted in 1949. South Korea began to operate a Supplementary military service(보충병역), divided into the 1st supplementary military service(제1보충병역) and the 2nd supplementary military service.(제2보충병역)

Supplementry military service was abolished by the revision of the Military Service Act in 1957, and those who were supplementary soldiers at the time were incorporated into the 1st reserve and the 2nd militia service according to their age. From 1962, the Supplementary service system was re-established with the enactment of the 1st Supplementary service and the 2nd Supplementary service.

In 1962, a call of defense was established after the establishment of the Bangwibyeong (:ko:방위병). in 1969, they were called to serve as Bangwibyeong. In 1971, the 1st supplementary service and 2nd supplementary service were abolished and became supplementary service. 

In 1973, Supplementary service requiring specific qualifications was established. In the late 1960s and early 1970s, supplementary services in South Korea began to operate in the form of alternative services that required military training.

In 1995, after the abolition of the call of defense, Social service personnel (:ko:사회복무요원) were classified as supplementary services, and supplementary services after 1995 meant alternative service in the private sector after mandatory military training.

References

See also 
 Conscription

Conscription